Susan Blackwell is an American actress, writer, and singer, best known for playing characters based on herself in the original musicals [title of show] and Now. Here. This. She has appeared in other plays, musicals, films, and television shows including Master of None, Madam Secretary, The Blacklist, Succession, Law & Order, P.S. I Love You, After the Wedding, Yes, God, Yes, and Speech and Debate. She created and hosts her own talk show, Side by Side by Susan Blackwell on Broadway.com.

[title of show]
Blackwell is known for the one-act musical [title of show], which played on Broadway in the 2008 Season after a successful extended Off-Broadway run at the Vineyard Theatre in 2006.

The musical documents its own creation by two Broadway fans, who want to enter the New York Musical Theatre Festival and struggle to complete the show in three and a half weeks, and their two actress friends. The actors are also the writers and characters of the musical.

Blackwell's character, "Susan", is a quirky performer by night and corporate drone by day—what Blackwell calls a "distillation" of her true personality.

Blackwell became involved in the musical's development early on through her longstanding friendships with the show's writer, Hunter Bell, and composer, Jeff Bowen (who also star in the show, as "Hunter" and "Jeff"). Blackwell had worked with the two men as part of her previous Off-Off-Broadway performing duo, the New Wondertwins.

At the time Bowen and Bell began work on [title of show], Blackwell had decided to abandon performing for a stable, corporate office job.

"I feel really grateful to my friends for rescuing me," she said of her role in [title of show]. "They airlifted me out of very corporate ascension and plopped me down into this whole other experience."

Other work
Blackwell began her professional acting career with a two-year stint in the company of Minnesota's Guthrie Theatre before moving to New York in 1995.

Blackwell subsequently developed a reputation as a quirky downtown theatre artist. Blackwell performed Off-Off-Broadway with Rebecca Finnegan as The New Wondertwins, a variety act whose assortment of songs, sketches, and daredevil feats included ventriloquism and making deviled eggs in their mouths.

One Village Voice reviewer wrote of the duo in 1999: "Their wordless finale, orchestrated to a space-age bachelor-pad soundtrack, is a tour de force of fascination and horror: never have soy milk and deviled eggs been used to such loathsome effect."

In addition to [title of show]'''s Off-Broadway and Broadway runs, Blackwell's more recent credits include the Off-Broadway shows Speech and Debate, Anon, Working Title, Vilna's Got a Golem, and The Heidi Chronicles.

Blackwell's television appearances include The Sopranos, Third Watch, All My Children, The Good Wife, Person of Interest, and several episodes of Law & Order and Law & Order: Criminal Intent.

Her film credits include P.S. I Love You, Margin Call, Margot at the Wedding, Changing Lanes, the short Bun-Bun, and Night Int. Trailer for the feature film Ten Minutes Older.Blackwell joined [title of show] castmates Hunter Bell, Jeff Bowen, and Heidi Blickenstaff in 2012 for the off-Broadway musical Now. Here. This. for which she also co-wrote the book with Hunter Bell.

In 2018, Blackwell was seen in the Encores! Off-Center production of The Civilians' Gone Missing.

In 2019, Blackwell performed in a one-night-only Broadway concert performance of [title of show] to benefit The Actor's Fund. She appeared alongside the entire original cast, and the evening was directed and choreographed by Michael Berresse.

In September 2019, Blackwell began co-hosting a podcast with fellow actress Laura Camien called The Spark File.

Personal life
Blackwell was born and raised in Dayton, Ohio. She attended Bethel Local Schools. She has a B.F.A. in acting from Wright State University and an M.F.A. in acting from the University of Minnesota. She is married to Nathan Heidt.

She is well known by many Broadway stars through her online video show Side by Side by Susan Blackwell''. As part of the show, as the ending schtik, she often licks her interviewee's face. She has licked Daniel Radcliffe, Sutton Foster, Darren Criss, Andrew Keenan-Bolger, Laura Benanti, Stephanie J. Block, Jesse Tyler Ferguson, Zachary Quinto, and Jonathan Groff, among others.

Acting credits

Theatre

Television

Film

References

External links

[title of show] on Myspace

Year of birth missing (living people)
Living people
American musical theatre actresses
University of Minnesota College of Liberal Arts alumni
21st-century American actresses
American stage actresses
American television actresses
Actresses from Dayton, Ohio
American film actresses
21st-century American women singers